The neighborhoods of Omaha are a diverse collection of community areas and specific enclaves. They are spread throughout the Omaha metro area, and are all on the Nebraska side of the Missouri River.

History
Omaha's original neighborhoods were clustered around the original settlement area near 12th and Jackson Street. On the southwest corner of that intersection William P. Snowden, the city's first settler, built the St. Nicholas Hotel in 1854, three years before the city was incorporated. Early neighborhoods included the Sporting District and the Burnt District. In the early decades after settlement the city expanded, building the Near North Side, Sheelytown (Irish immigrants), and housing districts throughout what is now Downtown Omaha.

In the 1880s the next wave of development occurred where land was available at downtown's southern and western edges, including: Bemis Park, Dahlman, Deer Park, Dogtown, Gifford Park, Hanscom Park, and Kountze Place and Little Bohemia.

Former towns
The boundaries of Omaha have changed significantly since its founding, with the city growing through subdivisions and annexations.  The following areas of the city were incorporated towns which have been annexed by the city of Omaha.  Beechwood was located near the now-gone Florence Lake in East Omaha. It had its own school district, and the site is now occupied by several trailer courts.  Benson is a neighborhood of north-central Omaha near 60th and Maple Streets; it was annexed in 1917.  Dundee is a neighborhood in central Omaha near 50th and Dodge Streets.  Originally a separate city, Dundee was annexed by Omaha in 1915, but the residents fought annexation in the courts until 1917.  Elkhorn takes its name from the Elkhorn River and was incorporated by an act of the territorial legislature in 1889.  It was annexed by Omaha on March 8, 2005 after a two-year court battle.  Elkhorn became part of Omaha on March 1, 2007.  The original town site is near 204th St. and West Maple Road in West Omaha.

Florence is a neighborhood in far north Omaha.  The original Mormon settlement in Florence, called Cutler's Park, predated the founding of Omaha in 1846.  Florence was annexed by Omaha in 1917.  Hayes was a historic town located two miles from Bennington that evaporated in the 1870s, when the railroad failed to come to the town.  Millard is a broad area of southwest Omaha, originally a separate city and annexed in 1971.  The original town site is near 132nd and Q Streets.  Saratoga is a historic neighborhood in North Omaha. The town was founded, boomed and busted within one year (1856–57). Its legacy includes a school, library and businesses still in the area.

Adjoining cities and towns
Several nearby cities and towns operate as suburbs of Omaha.  The largest is Bellevue, which may be the oldest settlement in Nebraska and is the state's third largest city.  It is located just south of Omaha in eastern Sarpy County. Bennington was founded in the 1880s and was originally called "Bunz Town". Located northwest of the city, it was a key stop along the Fremont, Elkhorn, and Missouri Valley Railroad in the early 1900s.  Carter Lake, Iowa, which was formerly on the eastern side of the Missouri River, today sits nestled into Nebraska.  Irvington was first named Pappio because of its location on Pappio Creek.  The city is increasingly encroaching on this town in its northwestern corner.  La Vista is a city south of Omaha in north-central Sarpy County.  Papillion is a city south of Omaha and immediately south of La Vista.  It is the county seat of Sarpy County.  Ralston is a city in south-central Douglas County roughly bounded by 72nd, 84th, L, and Harrison Streets.  It is surrounded by Omaha on three sides.  The other side borders with La Vista.  Valley was established in 1886 and was an important shipping point along the Union Pacific Railroad. Waterloo was incorporated in 1883 along the Elkhorn river and borders the west of Omaha. Waterloo was once the world's largest shipper of seed corn, and was home of the Douglas County Fair for over 80 years.

Community areas

Omaha is split into several geographically designated areas, which cover several neighborhoods. Midtown is a racially diverse, historically rich area of Omaha immediately west of Downtown Omaha. North Omaha is a community area north of downtown Omaha with a rich historical, architectural, and religious legacy, particularly for the city's African American population.  South Omaha is a community area encompassing many neighborhoods south of downtown Omaha which historically has been home to Omaha's Eastern European immigrant population, and more recently, Central and North American Hispanic immigrants.  Churches and other structures reflect its rich past.  Formerly a portion of this area was a separate city named South Omaha; it was annexed by Omaha in 1915.  West Omaha is the collective term for areas of the city west of 72nd Street, and the area of newer suburbs and community institutions, the next wave of historically significant buildings.  Within that broad area there are several sub-community areas including Northwest Omaha, Southwest Omaha, Millard and Irvington. Also, much further to the west is the newly annexed community area/past city of Elkhorn.

North Omaha 
Scriptown was a conspicuous development first platted in 1855 to award Nebraska Territory legislators for the votes for statehood. It was bound by 16th street on the east, 24th on the west and Lake Street to the north. The area was developed quickly, and included a number of prominent homes. The land therein formed the nucleus of Near North Omaha. Near North Omaha became one of the most historically significant communities in Omaha, as it developed commercially and socially into the 20th century. The area was bound by downtown Omaha on the south and the Saratoga neighborhood on the north, 30th Street on the west and 16th Avenue on the east. Created by historical German, Irish, Jewish, and African Americans, the community became a renowned center of Black culture in the United States in the 1920s. From then through the 1960s, the area was dominated by black-owned businesses, churches and social centers. There were also a number of Jewish-owned businesses, as well. The area was the site of several riots in the 1960s, and decayed for the next 30 years. The Great Plains Black History Museum was started there in 1976. Over the last 20 years a series of community restoration projects, including the demolition of the Logan Fontenelle Housing Projects and the creation of Dreamland Plaza, has sought to revitalize the community.

The Saratoga community is the location of a historical town that boomed and busted within one year of its founding. Its legacy includes a school, library and businesses still in the area. Also in the area is Kountze Place, a former suburban enclave of wealthy Omaha doctors, lawyers and businessmen. The northeast part of North Omaha, roughly defined by all areas north of Dodge Street and east of 16th Street, until Fort Street when Florence Boulevard becomes the western boundary. The eastern boundary is the Missouri River. Neighborhoods in this section of North Omaha include Carter Lake, Iowa, East Omaha and Beechwood. Carter Lake was formerly on the eastern side of the Missouri River. Originally part of the township of East Omaha, the community was ceded to the State of Iowa after a contentious court battle in the late 1890s. Omaha's Levi Carter Park is located here. Beechwood was located near Florence Lake in East Omaha. Located next to the Missouri River and the now-dry Florence Lake, Beechwood had its own school district and commercial area. Today it is site of a trailer court by the same name. East Omaha proper was once an agricultural area. Once considered for the site of the Trans-Mississippi Exposition, it lost out to Kountze Park. Omaha's main airport, Eppley Airfield, is now in East Omaha, and the community has been the location of racial contention for several years. East Omaha was the first annexation to the City of Omaha in 1854.

Far north Omaha includes everything north of Ames Avenue, west of Florence Boulevard, and east of 72nd Street. It includes Florence, the original Mormon settlement of Cutler's Park, which predates the founding of the City of Omaha; it was annexed in 1917. Miller Park, a neighborhood named after Omaha pioneer Dr. George Miller, was primarily developed from 1920 to 1950, bound by 30th Street on the west and Florence Blvd on the east, Miller Park on the north and Sorenson Parkway on the south. It is the location of several churches, an elementary school and a park by the same name. Minne Lusa is a neighborhood in far North Omaha primarily developed from 1915 and 1926, and bound by Miller Park on the south, Florence on the north, Florence Boulevard and Pershing Drive on the east, and 30th Street on the west. The southwest part of North Omaha includes Benson, located near 60th and Maple Streets. Originally incorporated as a city in the 1880s, it was annexed to Omaha in 1917. Benson has several historic locations, and is an important neighborhood today. Next to Benson is Dundee, near 50th and Dodge Streets. Originally a separate city, Dundee was annexed by Omaha in 1915, but this annexation was fought until 1917. The Gold Coast neighborhood, including St. Cecilia Cathedral, has several important architectural gems, as well as several historical parks. Other important historical neighborhoods in this area include Gifford Park, Orchard Hill and Walnut Hill.

Covenants and racial restrictions 

Omaha has a history of race-restrictive housing. Housing covenants became common in the 1920s and were validated by the U.S. Supreme Court in 1926. Where there were small ethnic enclaves in early Omaha history, racial minorities were effectively limited to specific neighborhoods in North Omaha and a part of South Omaha. The black neighborhood in Omaha was clearly defined by redlining practices used by real estate agents, and was identified as the Near Northside. Kountze Place, the second Gold Coast, Dundee and other Omaha neighborhoods and blocks had racially or ethnically restrictive housing covenants.

Further restrictions on conveyance (rental, lease, sale, transfer) were often included, effectively defining most of the neighborhoods in Omaha during the first decades after establishment.

The Supreme Court ruled in 1948 that racial restrictions would no longer be enforced. After more than a decade of pressure from the Urban League and others, the City of Omaha adopted an Open Housing Ordinance in 1969. Although unenforceable, legal complications prevent the covenants from being expunged from property title documents.

Neighborhoods
There are countless current and historically specific neighborhoods throughout Omaha. Perhaps prime among them is the Old Market, a mixed-use commercial/residential district in downtown Omaha that historically housed Omaha's fresh food vendors.

The central area of Omaha, immediately west of downtown and extending to 72nd Street, is home to several of historically significant neighborhoods. Gifford Park, Morton Meadows, Gold Coast and Country Club are important to the history of Omaha. Bemis Park is centrally located, and is home to a number of architecturally significant homes and public works.

Located in West Omaha is Boys Town, an incorporated village near 132nd and Dodge Streets and is home to the famous institution of the same name. Also on the fringe of the city is Chalco, an unincorporated area southwest of Omaha in northern Sarpy County that forms its own neighborhood.

South 24th Street, Sheelytown, Little Bohemia, Little Italy, Brown Park, Dog Hollow, and Little Poland are all located throughout South Omaha. Spring Lake and Deer Park are also located in the area, as well as Field Club and the Omaha Quartermaster Depot Historic District.

In North Omaha, the area of East Omaha was the first annexation to the city in 1854, and is home to a large park and the city's airport. Miller Park is a neighborhood in far North Omaha primarily developed from 1920 to 1950, bound by 30th Street on the west and Florence Blvd on the east, Miller Park on the north and Sorenson Parkway on the south. The Fort Omaha Historic District borders this neighborhood. Immediately to the north is Minne Lusa, a neighborhood primarily developed from 1900-1950, bound by Miller Park on the south, Florence on the north, Florence Blvd and Pershing Drive on the east and 30th Street on the west.

Near North Omaha is a historical neighborhood close to downtown Omaha. It is bound by downtown Omaha on the south and Kountze Park to the north. Kountze was once a posh Omaha suburb, reachable only via streetcar. It consumed most of the former Saratoga community's land to the north. 30th Street on the west and 16th Avenue on the east border each of these areas. Omaha's Prospect Hill neighborhood is home to the city's pioneer cemetery of the same name, as well as some of the oldest homes in the city.

List of neighborhoods in Omaha

See also
Landmarks in Omaha, Nebraska
Council Bluffs, Iowa

See also
History of Omaha, Nebraska

References

External links
 Neighborhoods - City of Omaha.
 Neighborhoods and Housing - Greater Omaha Chamber of Commerce.
 Neighborhood Scan - University of Nebraska at Omaha.